Juan Schwanner, János Schwanner (5 February 1921 – 8 May 2015) was a Hungarian–Chilean football player and manager.

Personal life
Schwanner was born János Schwanner in Hungary to parents of Hungarian and Chilean descent. While playing football in Chile he took up Chilean citizenship and adopted the Spanish name Juan.

Playing career
After stints with Hungarian clubs Schwanner moved to Flamengo in Brazil. He later moved to Chile where he played for Audax Italiano and Colo Colo.

Managerial career
Schwanner coached Grazer AK, Club Brugge, New Zealand, Luzern, Zürich and Melbourne Hakoah.

References

External links
 
 

1921 births
2015 deaths
Sportspeople from Szombathely
Hungarian footballers
Sportspeople of Chilean descent
Hungarian emigrants to Chile
Citizens of Chile through descent
Chilean people of Hungarian descent
Chilean people of Austrian descent
Chilean footballers
CR Flamengo footballers
Audax Italiano footballers
Colo-Colo footballers
Chilean Primera División players
Hungarian expatriate sportspeople in Brazil
Hungarian expatriate sportspeople in Chile
Expatriate footballers in Brazil
Expatriate footballers in Chile
Hungarian football managers
Hungarian expatriate football managers
Chilean football managers
Chilean expatriate football managers
Grazer AK managers
Club Brugge KV head coaches
New Zealand national football team managers
FC Luzern managers
FC Zürich managers
Hungarian expatriate sportspeople in Austria
Hungarian expatriate sportspeople in Belgium
Hungarian expatriate sportspeople in Switzerland
Hungarian expatriate sportspeople in Australia
Chilean expatriate sportspeople in Austria
Chilean expatriate sportspeople in Belgium
Chilean expatriate sportspeople in New Zealand
Chilean expatriate sportspeople in Switzerland
Chilean expatriate sportspeople in Australia
Expatriate football managers in Austria
Expatriate football managers in Belgium
Expatriate association football managers in New Zealand
Expatriate football managers in Switzerland
Expatriate soccer managers in Australia
Naturalized citizens of Chile
Association footballers not categorized by position